The 2018–19 Quaid-e-Azam Trophy was a first-class domestic cricket competition that took place in Pakistan from 1 September to 8 December 2018. Following the conclusion of each match, the teams played each other in a List A fixture in the 2018–19 Quaid-e-Azam One Day Cup tournament. Sui Northern Gas Pipelines Limited were the defending champions.

In April 2018, Zarai Taraqiati Bank Limited (ZTBL) won the Patron's Trophy Grade-II tournament to qualify for this years' edition of the competition. ZTBL won their opening fixture of the Quaid-e-Azam Trophy, against Lahore Blues, by 151 runs.

Prior to the start of the tournament, two players were dropped by their teams. Ahmed Shehzad, captain of Habib Bank Limited (HBL), was left out of HBL's squad after testing positive for the use of a banned substance. Hasan Raza was not selected to play for Pakistan Television, after his alleged involvement in spot-fixing.

During the tournament, the quality of some of the pitches was questioned. This included the fixture between Water and Power Development Authority and Sui Southern Gas Company, which was abandoned on day one due to an unsafe pitch, before it was restarted as a three-day game, and the fixture between Sui Northern Gas Pipelines Limited and Habib Bank Limited, which saw Sui Northern Gas Pipelines Limited being bowled out for just 35 runs in their first innings.

In Pool A, Sui Northern Gas Pipelines Limited, Peshawar, Khan Research Laboratories and Habib Bank Limited all progressed to the Super Eight section of the tournament. They were joined by Sui Southern Gas Corporation, Water and Power Development Authority, Karachi Whites and Lahore Blues from Pool B. The Super Eight fixtures were originally scheduled to take place in Lahore. However, the Pakistan Cricket Board (PCB) moved the matches to Karachi due to bad weather. Meanwhile, Islamabad from Pool A and Zarai Taraqiati Bank Limited from Pool B were both relegated to the second-tier for the next season.

Sui Northern Gas Pipelines and Habib Bank Limited won their respective Super Eight groups to progress to the final of the tournament. For the first time in several years, the final was not shown live on television. Habib Bank Limited won the tournament, despite the final ending as a draw, after they took a first-innings lead in the match.

Teams
The following teams are competing in the 2018–19 tournament:

Regional
 Federally Administered Tribal Areas
 Islamabad
 Karachi Whites
 Lahore Blues
 Lahore Whites
 Multan
 Peshawar
 Rawalpindi

Department
 Habib Bank Limited
 Khan Research Laboratories
 National Bank of Pakistan
 Pakistan Television
 Sui Northern Gas Pipelines Limited
 Sui Southern Gas Company
 Water and Power Development Authority
 Zarai Taraqiati Bank Limited

United Bank Limited, who topped Pool B in previous edition of the competition, were disbanded in July 2018. Faisalabad scored only one point in the previous tournament. Zarai Taraqiati Bank Limited were promoted from the Patron's Trophy Grade-II tournament to replace them. Multan were added to the teams in this years' tournament.

Points table

Pool A

 Team qualified for the Super Eight

Pool B

 Team qualified for the Super Eight

Group stage

Pool A

Round 1

Round 2

Round 3

Round 4

Round 5

Round 6

Round 7

Pool B

Round 1

Round 2

Round 3

Round 4

Round 5

Round 6

Round 7

Super Eight

Group 1

 Team qualified for the Final

Group 2

 Team qualified for the Final

Group 1

Group 2

Final

References

External links
 Series home at ESPN Cricinfo

Domestic cricket competitions in 2018–19
2018 in Pakistani cricket
2018-19 Quaid-e-Azam Trophy
Pakistani cricket seasons from 2000–01